Nationwide is the debut album of Surgery, released in 1990 through Amphetamine Reptile Records.

Track listing

Personnel 
Surgery
Scott Kleber – guitar
John Lachapelle – bass guitar
John Leamy – drums
Sean McDonnell – vocals
Production and additional personnel
Dave Deuteronomy – design
Tom Hazelmyer – design
Michael Lavine – photography
Surgery – production
Wharton Tiers – production, drums on "Highway 109"

References

External links 
 

1990 albums
Albums produced by Wharton Tiers
Amphetamine Reptile Records albums
Surgery (band) albums